Jasmine is a flowering shrub of the genus Jasminum. It may also refer to:

Plants 
Several other plants unrelated to Jasminum with similar flowers, including:
Brazilian jasmine Mandevilla sanderi 
Cape jasmine Gardenia
Carolina jasmine, Gelsemium sempervirens 
Chilean jasmine, Mandevilla laxa 
Madagascar jasmine, Stephanotis floribunda
New Zealand jasmine, Parsonsia capsularis
Night-blooming jasmine, Cestrum nocturnum 
Night-flowering jasmine, Nyctanthes arbor-tristis 
Orange jasmine, Murraya paniculata 
Red jasmine, Plumeria rubra
Star jasmine, Trachelospermum jasminoides 
Tree jasmine (disambiguation)
Water jasmine, Wrightia religiosa

People

Arts, entertainment, and media

Music
 Jasmine (album), by Keith Jarrett and Charlie Haden
 Jessamine (band), a musical group
 Jasmine Records, a record label
 Mo Li Hua ("Jasmine flower" in Chinese), a popular folk song in China
 Jasmine (song), a 2012 song by Jai Paul
 Jasmine, a song by Miles Gilderdale from Broken Sword 5: The Serpent's Curse

Other arts, entertainment, and media
 Jasmine (novel), a 1989 novel by Bharati Mukherjee
 Jasmine (TV series), a Philippine television series
 Jasmine: The Battle for the Mid-Realm, a role-playing card game
 Jasmine (film), a 2015 film by Dax Phelan

Politics
Jasmine Revolution (disambiguation)
Jasmine Revolution in China, February 2011

Other uses
 Jasmine (color)
 Jasmine (JavaScript testing framework), a unit testing framework for the JavaScript programming language
 Jasmine rice, a type of long-grain rice
 Jasmine, the hypothetical founding ancestor of Haplogroup J (mtDNA) in The Seven Daughters of Eve, a 2001 book about the science of human mitochondrial genetics

See also
Jasmin (disambiguation)
Yasmin (disambiguation)
Yasemin, a 1988 Turkish/German movie